Ray Noble is a musician and actor.

Ray Noble may also refer to:

Ray Noble (baseball)
Ray Noble (American football), see Ron Davenport
Ray Noble (basketball), played in 1937 NCAA Men's Basketball All-Americans